Pristimantis ockendeni is a species of frog in the family Strabomantidae.
It is found in Brazil, Colombia, Ecuador, Peru, and possibly Bolivia.
Its natural habitats are tropical moist lowland forests, tropical moist montane forests, and heavily degraded former forest.

Research published in early 2008 suggested that in Ecuador the species is actually at least three different cryptic species that diverged at least 5 million years ago.

References

ockendeni
Amphibians of Peru
Amphibians described in 1912
Taxonomy articles created by Polbot